The Romanian Air Force 86th Air Base "Lieutenant Aviator Gheorghe Mociorniță" is located in commune  Borcea, Călărași County. It is currently the home of the 53rd Fighter squadron (operating Lockheed Martin F-16s) and the 861st Fighter squadron (operating MiG-21 LanceRs), located at the Mihail Kogălniceanu Airport, 57th Air Base.

History
On 9 August 1958, the 206th Tactical Fighter Aviation Regiment, equipped with MiG-17PF fighters, together with the 499th Technical Base are moved to the Cocargeaua (today Borcea) aerodrome and received a squadron of MiG-19 aircraft. Since 1959, the 206th Tactical Fighter Aviation Regiment has been subordinated to the 15th Tactical Fighter Aviation Division and receives a new name - the 86th Fighter Aviation Regiment.

In 1967, an important change took place in the 86th Fighter Aviation Regiment, with the introduction of a new type of MiG-21F-13 fighter jet. Thus, the 86th Fighter Aviation Regiment was fully equipped with supersonic aircraft: two squadrons with MiG-21F-13 and one squadron with MiG-19.

In 1995, the 86th Fighter Aviation Regiment turned into the 86th Fighter Aviation Group and the 86th Fighter and Fighter Bomber Air Base. At the same time, the 86th Fighter Aviation Group was awarded the honorary title "Lieutenant Aviator ".

Starting in 1997, a squadron at the 86th Air base began intensive training, in order to become capable of carrying out joint missions with NATO forces. A special training program was initiated, aiming at a higher level of interoperability, and for this purpose the Fighter-Bomber Squadron was fully equipped with MiG-21 LanceR's. By the end of 2000, as a result of the Romanian Air Force reform, the structure of the 86th Air Base changed again. The 86th Air base has now a modular structure, fitting NATO's airbase model and offering a real background for achieving appropriate interoperability at this level, with the declared purpose to provide the necessary basis to plan, organize, command, and accomplish the missions assigned.

In February 2022, hours after the Russian invasion of Ukraine, two F-35 Lightning II aircraft of the United States Air Forces in Europe landed at the 86th Air Base, in support of the NATO mission.

The current commanded of the base, succeeding General Cătălin Băhneanu, is Comandor Cătălin "Miki" Micloș, former commander of the 53rd Fighter Squadron.

References

External links
  Order of Battle of the RoAF
  86th Air Base on the Romanian Air Force official website

86
Buildings and structures in Ialomița County
1958 establishments in Romania